Janet Lambert (December 1893 – March 16, 1973) was an actress and the author of 54 young-adult fiction titles for girls from 1941 to 1969. Lambert's works, best known for the Penny and Tippy Parrish series, focused on the lives and coming-of-age choices of the wives and children, especially the daughters, of U.S. Army officers during World War II and the Korean War-era.

Family life

Lambert was born Maude Janet "Dodi" Snyder December 12 or 17, 1893 in or near Crawfordsville, Indiana, the daughter of Mabel Galey and Francis Leonidas Snyder.

She married Kent Craig Lambert (1891–1982) on January 1, 1918. Kent, a brother of longtime Purdue basketball coach, Ward Lambert, was a 1913 graduate of Wabash College in Crawfordsville, Indiana. Serving in World War I, he continued his Army career as a cavalry officer. In World War II, he saw service in North Africa, Anzio and China. His last posting was as post commander of Fort Jay, Governors Island, in New York City where he retired at the rank of colonel in 1951 after 34 years active duty. A photograph of Janet and Kent's formal military farewell from Fort Jay and the Army illustrated the dust jacket of one of her books.

Lambert performed on the Broadway stage in the years before and during World War I.

The couple had one daughter, Jeanne Anne Lambert (born 1918) who, much like a character in her mother's books, married a United States Military Academy graduate, Second Lieutenant Dean Titus Vanderhoef (USMA 1940), at Fort Jay's post chapel on July 27, 1940.

Literary legacy

Between 1941 and 1969, Lambert published 54 books at a rate of about two per year, but is often omitted from discussions of early young adult romance literature by critics.

Lambert integrated real-world events as background in her books, such as the reconstruction of Germany after World War II (Little Miss Atlas, 1949) and the Korean War (Don't Cry, Little Girl, 1952). Lambert's life experience as an Army wife provided the background and settings for many of her books about the lives of teenage children of military officers. While the U.S. Military Academy figures appear frequently in the lives of her characters, her husband did not attend West Point, gaining his officer training through the National Guard and mid-level Army schools such at the United States Army Cavalry School at Fort Riley, Kansas. In 1930, he was instructor at the Virginia Military Institute. Many of the male characters in Lambert's novels are soldiers or West Point students, and present a patriotic, "almost worshipful" view of the military.

As for her female characters, often military wives or children, she drew on her experiences and observations as a military wife who had to balance career aspirations and married life.

Lambert died on March 16, 1973, at Beach Haven, New Jersey, and is buried in Crawfordsville, Indiana.

Works

Listed by series and years of original publication:

PENNY PARRISH STORIES

Star Spangled Summer 1941
Dreams of Glory 1942
Glory Be! 1943
Up Goes the Curtain 1946
Practically Perfect 1947
The Reluctant Heart 1950

TIPPY PARRISH STORIES
Miss Tippy 1948
Little Miss Atlas 1949
Miss America 1951
Don't Cry, Little Girl 1952
Rainbow After Rain 1953
Welcome Home, Mrs. Jordon 1953
Song in Their Hearts 1956
Here's Marny 1969

JORDON STORIES
Just Jennifer 1945
Friday's Child 1947
Confusion by Cupid 1950
A Dream for Susan 1954
Love Taps Gently 1955
Myself & I 1957
The Stars Hang High 1960
Wedding Bells 1961
A Bright Tomorrow 1965

PARRI MACDONALD STORIES
Introducing Parri 1962
That's My Girl 1964
Stagestruck Parri 1966
My Davy 1968

CANDY KANE STORIES
Candy Kane 1943
Whoa, Matilda 1944
One for the Money 1946

DRIA MEREDITH STORIES
Star Dream 1951
Summer for Seven 1952
High Hurdles 1955

CAMPBELL STORIES
The Precious Days 1957
For Each Other 1959
Forever and Ever 1961
Five's a Crowd 1963
First of All 1966
The Odd Ones 1969

SUGAR BRADLEY STORIES
Sweet as Sugar 1967
Hi, Neighbor 1968

CHRISTIE DRAYTON STORIES
Where the Heart Is 1948
Treasure Trouble 1949

PATTY AND GINGER STORIES
We're Going Steady 1958
Boy Wanted 1959
Spring Fever 1960
Summer Madness 1962
Extra Special 1963
On Her Own 1964

CINDA HOLLISTER STORIES
Cinda 1954
Fly Away, Cinda 1956
Big Deal 1958
Triple Trouble 1965
Love to Spare 1967

References

United States of America, Bureau of the Census. Washington, D.C.: National Archives and Records Administration.
1900; Census Place: Union, Montgomery, Indiana; Roll: T623 394; Page: 18B; Enumeration District: 116.
1920; Census Place: Fort Riley, Geary, Kansas; Roll: T625_533; Page: 17A; Enumeration District: 62; Image: 293.
1930; Census Place: Lexington, Rockbridge, Virginia; Roll: 2458; Page: 3A; Enumeration District: 6; Image: 621.0.

 Lambert, Janet 1894-1973. (2001). In The Cambridge Guide to Children's Books in English.

External links
The Famous Janet Lambert Books
Book Safari Seriesbooks.com Girl's Stories By Janet Lambert
All About Fifties Teen Romances - Janet Lambert
Reprinted editions of Lambert books by Image Cascade Publishing
Short author's biography

Writers from Indiana
1893 births
1973 deaths
People from Crawfordsville, Indiana
20th-century American novelists
American women novelists
American writers of young adult literature
American romantic fiction novelists
20th-century American women writers